She County, or Shexian, is a county in the southeast of Anhui Province, China, bordering Zhejiang Province to the east. It is the easternmost county-level division of the prefecture-level city of Huangshan City.

She County is noted for its rich history and culture heritage. Its county seat is sometimes described as one of China's "four renowned ancient towns", along with Langzhong (Sichuan Province), Lijiang (Yunnan), and Pingyao (Shanxi).

She County has jurisdiction over 13 towns and 15 townships. The county seat of government is in Huicheng Town.

History
She County was established during the Qin Dynasty (221–208 BCE).

During the Song Dynasty, She County leader Fang La rebelled and was suppressed by the Song government.

During the Ming and Qing Dynasties, She County was the capital of Huizhou Prefecture.

Administrative divisions
She County is divided to 13 towns and 15 townships.
Towns

Townships

Geography
She County is a mountainous region with the Huangshan Tianmushan mountain ranges running through it. The Anhui–Jiangxi Railway traverses the county which is also a tea-producing area.

Climate

Tourism
She County has a number of cultural and natural sites that attract hundreds of thousands of tourists each year.
 Xu Guo Gate, a memorial established for Xu Guo, a Grand Secretary during the Ming Dynasty.
 Tanyue Gates
 Xin'anjiang (Xin'an River), the major river system of She County
 Yuliang Dam on Lianjian River, a tributary of the Xin'an River.
 Doushan Street

Notable people
Ming dynasty
 Wang Zhi, a powerful pirate during the Jiajing era
 Xu Guo, Grand Secretary under the Wanli Emperor

Qing dynasty: 
Zhang Zhao (張潮)
Modern era
 Tao Xingzhi, educator
 Ke Qingshi, politician

References

County-level divisions of Anhui
Huangshan City